he 1900 Geneva Covenanters football team was an American football team that represented Geneva College as an independent during the 1900 college football season. Led by first-year head coach Samuel G. Craig, the team compiled a record of 5–1–1.

Schedule

References

Geneva
Geneva Golden Tornadoes football seasons
Geneva Covenanters football